The Kaiserpreis auto race, named after Emperor Wilhelm II, was held in 1907. Like his brother's Prinz-Heinrich-Fahrt held from 1908 to 1911, it was a precursor to the German Grand Prix.

As Camille Jenatzy had won the Gordon Bennett Cup in auto racing in 1903 with a Mercedes, Germany had to stage the 1904 event. The Cup was won by Léon Théry in a Richard-Brasier, and the Gordon Bennett race returned to France for 1905 and 1906, but was not continued as such in 1907, as Grand Prix motor racing evolved.

On the same track as the Gordon Bennett three years earlier, Germany staged its second large international event in 1907, the Kaiserpreis auto race (after sailing and rowing events were also named so). Entries were limited to touring cars with engines of less than eight litres. The race was won by Italian Felice Nazzaro in a Fiat 130 HP, against competition from Opel, Mercedes, Eisenach, Adler and others.

In 1908, the Prinz-Heinrich-Fahrt resumed until 1911.

Results 
See 1907 Kaiserpreis.

External links 
https://web.archive.org/web/20060420013018/http://www.gpracing.net192.com/history/golden_age.cfm 
http://www.kolumbus.fi/leif.snellman/gpw1.htm